Auric Air Services Limited is a small privately owned airline based in Tanzania, Operating from Mwalimu Julius Nyerere International Airport (JNIA) Dar-es-salaam, Arusha Airport and Mwanza Airport. The Company offers scheduled flights to 42 destinations within East Africa as well as on demand private non-scheduled air charter.

Destinations
Scheduled flights are operated to the following destinations:

Fleet

Auric Air fleet consists of the following sixteen aircraft (as of February 2023):

Accidents and incidents 

 On 23 September 2019, a Cessna 208 Grand Caravan, registration number 5H-AAM, was damaged beyond repair when it crashed shortly after takeoff from Seronera Airstrip, under unclear circumstances. The pilot, Nelson Mabeyo, and the other passenger who was a student pilot both died in the crash.

References

External links
 Official website

Airlines of Tanzania
Airlines established in 2001
2001 establishments in Tanzania